Shuichi Akai may refer to:

Shuichi Akai (footballer) (born 1981), Japanese footballer
Shuichi Akai (Case Closed), a fictional character in Japanese manga series Case Closed